Pine Run is a tributary to Neshannock Creek in western Pennsylvania.  The stream rises in southeastern Mercer County and flows west entering Neshannock Creek south and downstream of Mercer, Pennsylvania. The watershed is roughly 41% agricultural, 50% forested and the rest is other uses.

References

Rivers of Pennsylvania
Tributaries of the Beaver River
Rivers of Mercer County, Pennsylvania